Frank Bartolillo (born 22 December 1981) is a profoundly deaf Australian fencer. He competed in the individual foil event at the 2004 Summer Olympics.

See also
 Deaf people in the Olympics

References

External links
 

1981 births
Living people
Australian male fencers
Olympic fencers of Australia
Fencers at the 2004 Summer Olympics
Sportspeople from Sydney